The 1924–25 British Home Championship was a football tournament played between the British Home Nations during the 1924–25 season. It was one of six tournaments in seven years won by the strong Scottish team of the early 1920s, and was achieved with a whitewash of all three rivals, including England in the deciding game in Glasgow.

Both England and Scotland began well with 3–1 victories, England over Ireland and Scotland over Wales in Swansea. England went ahead by defeating Wales away in their second game but were brought back level by Scotland who beat Ireland 3–0 at Windsor Park. In the deciding match, the Scots outplayed their Southern rivals at home, winning 2–0 to take the title. Wales and Ireland were unable to decide for third place, sharing it in a scoreless draw at Wrexham.

Table

Results

Winning squad

References

1924–25 in English football
1924–25 in Scottish football
Brit
1925 in British sport
1924-25
1924 in British sport
1924–25 in Northern Ireland association football